Derek Robinson (born 31 July 1931) is a British former sports shooter. He competed in the 50 metre rifle, three positions event at the 1960 Summer Olympics.

References

External links
 

1931 births
Possibly living people
British male sport shooters
Olympic shooters of Great Britain
Shooters at the 1960 Summer Olympics
Sportspeople from Gravesend, Kent